Lee Joon-hyuk (born March 13, 1984) is a South Korean actor.

Career
Lee Joon-hyuk made his entertainment debut in 2006 (January 20) by appearing in a music video by hip hop band Typhoon. He began acting in the 2007 television drama First Wives' Club, followed by a few supporting turns. Lee rise to popularity with his starring roles in Three Brothers (2009), I Am Legend (2010), City Hunter (2011), and Man from the Equator (2012).

In 2011, Lee appeared in Carried by the Wind, a reality show that aired as part of Sunday Night in which several male celebrities go on a road trip in the United States to learn about music. He also expanded his Korean Wave fan base by starring in the Chinese television drama Half a Fairytale in 2012.

Lee enlisted for his mandatory military service on June 19, 2012, and was discharged on March 18, 2014. He made his acting comeback in My Spring Days.

In 2017, Lee gained recognition with his roles in crime thriller Stranger and fantasy epic Along With the Gods: The Two Worlds. In 2018, Lee played the lead role in the medical drama A Poem a Day and the second lead role in the scifi drama Are You Human? In 2019, Lee joined the cast of the critically acclaimed tvN drama Designated Survivor: 60 Days and of the OCN drama The Lies Within. He also played the role of baseball coach Choi Jin-tae alongside Lee Joo-young in the independent film Baseball Girl, which premiered at the 24th Busan International Film Festival on October 4, 2019.

In 2020, Lee starred in the timetravel mystery thriller 365: Repeat the Year as a detective of a homicide team. That role brought him Best Acting Award at the 5th Asia Artist Awards, as well as Excellence Award (Actor in a Monday-Tuesday Miniseries) at the 39th MBC Drama Awards. Later that year he reprised his role of Seo Dong-jae in the second season of Stranger.

In 2021, Lee starred in the OCN drama Dark Hole, had a cameo role in the tvN drama Secret Royal Inspector & Joy and is set to appear in Kwak Kyung-taek's film Firefighter.

In August 2020, Lee achieved 'Three-Civil-Servants' award of the year. In November 2020, Lee appointed as 'Honorary Firefighter' by the president of South Korea on '58th Firefighter Day's Celebration'. He was awarded this title for his generous donation of his full fee from Naked Fireman drama to 'South Korea Fire Service' and appearing in two firefighting-related projects.

In 2021, Lee was featured on The Actor is Present – The Korean Actors 200 KOFIC campaign. His KOFIC biography tagline was "a generalist who meticulously plays selfishness, justice, and the extremes of human emotions".

Philanthropy 
On December 6, 2022, Lee decided to donate all royalties to animal protection organizations right from the pre-publishing stage of 'Hello Popcorn'.

Filmography

Film

Television series

Web series

Variety show

Hosting

Music video appearances

Discography

Awards and nominations

References

External links
 
 

South Korean male television actors
South Korean male film actors
South Korean male models
1984 births
Living people
21st-century South Korean male actors
L&Holdings artists